Group B of the 2015 AFC Asian Cup was one of four groups of nations competing at the 2015 AFC Asian Cup. The group's first round of matches were played on 10 January, the second round on 14 January, and the final round on 18 January. All six group matches were played at venues in Australia. The group consisted of Uzbekistan, Saudi Arabia, China and North Korea. China PR and Uzbekistan advanced as group winners and runners-up respectively, while Saudi Arabia and North Korea were eliminated.

Teams

Notes

Standings

In the quarter-finals:
China PR advanced to play Australia (runner-up of Group A).
Uzbekistan advanced to play South Korea (winner of Group A).

Matches

Uzbekistan vs North Korea
Igor Sergeev netted with a fine header just after the hour mark to secure all three points for Mirjalol Qosimov's side as they look to build on the country's last four finish in Qatar in 2011. Uzbekistan controlled large swathes of the game, but were unable to make their dominance tell until Sergeev nodded in Server Djeparov's cross from the left.

Odil Ahmedov had an early sight of goal when he tried his luck with a speculative long-range effort with just four minutes on the clock that went woefully wide before Timur Kapadze's deflected header came off the post. With the start of the second half came the torrential rain, which swept across the stadium to make conditions almost impossible. Uzbekistan almost claimed a second when Sanzhar Tursunov's free kick past his own goalkeeper with 10 minutes remaining while, with just three minutes left of the clock, Tursanov close-range effort was straight at Ri Myong-guk. The Uzbeks were almost made to pay for missing those opportunities with the last action of the game when Pak Kwang-ryong directed his powerful header towards goal, but Ignatiy Nesterov's reflex save was good enough to ensure Uzbekistan's held on for the win.

Saudi Arabia vs China PR
A late and somewhat fortunate free kick by Yu Hai proved to be the lone goal of the match as Saudi Arabia paid the price for Naif Hazazi's missed second-half penalty against Alain Perrin's side. Both China, who are looking to return to the quarter-finals for the first time since hosting the competition in 2004, and Saudi Arabia failed to qualify for the knockout phase at last edition. Three-time champions Saudi Arabia enjoyed the better moments early on with their technique-oriented game, seeing more time on the ball and pushing China deep into their own half. However, they failed to translate possession into opportunities and could not produce a single shot on target before the intermission.

The second half opened gingerly before Saudi Arabia kicked it into a higher gear on the hour mark, Hazazi breaking free down the inside left channel to win a penalty off defender Ren Hang who tackled one step too late. Ren, nevertheless, was bailed out by his keeper Wang Dalei who read Hazazi well from the spot, diving to his left to deny the Saudis the lead as the Chinese half of the crowd at Brisbane Stadium erupted in joy.

China nearly stung Saudi Arabia right away at the opposite end, Ren forcing a two-handed stop from Waleed Abdullah with a close-range header towards the bottom right corner of the net. The deadlock was finally broken after 80 minutes when Yu's free kick, from outside the box, took a wicked deflection off a defender to the wrong-footed Abdullah who, despite a desperate attempt to keep Yu's effort out, saw the ball skip into his net.

North Korea vs Saudi Arabia
Mohammad Al-Sahlawi scored twice in quick succession just after half-time as three-time winners Saudi Arabia kept their quarter-final hopes alive after recording a 4–1 comeback win over North Korea on Wednesday. North Korea's first AFC Asian Cup goal since November 1992 scored after 11 minutes from Ryang Yong-gi had given Jo Tong-sop's side hope of bouncing back from their opening defeat by Uzbekistan in Group B. But after Naif Hazazi equalised for Saudi Arabia before half-time, Al Sahlawi's quickfire double in the space of three second-half minutes and a late strike from Nawaf Al Abed ensured Cosmin Olăroiu's side their first three points of the campaign having lost to China PR at the weekend and ended the quarter-final hopes of former semi-finalists North Korea. With both sides seeking their first points of the campaign at Melbourne Rectangular Stadium, North Korea made an aggressive start as Sim Hyon-jin was denied twice in quick succession by Saudi Arabia goalkeeper Waleed Abdullah, with the first from a dipping strike from the edge of the penalty area in the seventh minute and the second a glancing header from the resulting corner.

Abdullah, though, was beaten just four minutes later as Ryang followed up after the Saudi Arabia custodian could only parry Pak Kwang-ryong's dipping angled volley from Jong Il-gwan's knockdown back out towards the penalty spot. Saudi Arabia looked for an instant response as Hazazi headed agonisingly wide from inside the penalty area six minutes later as Ri Myong-guk's goal came under increasing pressure as the half progressed. And Saudi Arabia equalised eight minutes before half-time as the Green Falcons quickly worked the ball across the edge of the penalty area for Al Abed to tee-up Hazazi, and the Al Shabab striker fired low through the legs of the North Korea goalkeeper at his near post. Ri Myong-guk, though, did come to North Korea's rescue three minutes before half-time as the custodian produced a superb one-handed save low to his left to turn Al Abed's equally eye-catching turn and volley around the post.

But as Saudi Arabia continued to dominate into the second half, Ri Myong-guk was again beaten seven minutes after half-time as Al Sahlawi was on hand to stab home from close range after Abdullah Al-Zori's low drilled cross had taken a fortunate deflection off Jang Kuk-chol and North Korea handed Saudi Arabia a third goal just two minutes later as Jang Song-hyok's overhit backpass caused confusion between Ri Yong-jik and goalkeeper Ri Myong-guk on the edge of the penalty area, and with the defender only able to drill his attempted clearance against Al Sahlawi, the striker simply rolled the ball into the empty net. Al Sahlawi had a chance to seal his hat-trick with 19 minutes remaining, but after racing clear of the North Korea backline and with only Ri Myong-guk to beat, the striker poked his effort wide shortly before being substituted.

Saudi Arabia, though, did add a fourth with 13 minutes remaining as Al Abed followed up having seen his penalty saved by Ri Myong-guk after Ri Yong-jik had been sent-off in unfortunate circumstances as Salem Al-Dawsari's chipped effort from inside the area had rebounded back off the crossbar and hit the midfielder's raised arm.

China PR vs Uzbekistan
China returned to the AFC Asian Cup quarter-finals after an 11-year absence with a come-from-behind 2–1 win against Uzbekistan at Brisbane Stadium, their first ever victory over Uzbekistan at any official tournament since the 2002 FIFA World Cup qualification, having won only once, drawn once and lost three previous encounters over the Uzbeks. 2011 edition semi-finalists Uzbekistan drew first blood midway through the opening half thanks to Odil Ahmedov, but China turned the tables on the white wolves after the break with goals from Wu Xi and substitute Sun Ke to grab the three points and the first ticket to the second round from Group B. Uzbekistan lie third behind Saudi Arabia on goal difference, with North Korea at the foot of the table. The Chinese came close to breaking the deadlock in the fifth minute, when Wu Lei surged through the middle to latch on to a cross from the left, only to miss by inches. China duly got a taste of their own medicine after 22 minutes when Ahmedov shook off Wu outside the box before letting rip a shot. Wu recovered, sliding in to attempt to block Ahmedov's shot - but only succeeded in changing the trajectory of the ball, which escaped goalkeeper Wang Dalei and bounced into the net.

Uzbekistan took the lead into the break but failed to hold on, as China restored parity on 55 minutes. Striker Gao Lin set things up with a dazzling assist from the right by-line, flicking the ball into the path of Wu who atoned for his first-half deflection by firing home into the bottom left corner to make it 1–1. Alain Perrin's side then moved in front through Gao's 66th-minute substitute Sun Ke. Just two minutes after coming on, Sun beat Ignatiy Nesterov fair and square from the edge of the box, curling his shot beyond the outstretched arms of the Uzbekistan custodian to hand China the advantage.

China were in the ascendancy, and twice came close to extending their advantage, defender Zhang Linpeng missing a completely free shot from the centre of the penalty area and Sun failing to put away a second in a one-on-one with Nesterov. Uzbekistan could not claw their way back into the match before the Chinese supporters erupted after three minutes of stoppage time and the final whistle.

Uzbekistan vs Saudi Arabia
Sardor Rashidov scored twice as Uzbekistan set up a quarter-final match with South Korea after securing a crucial 3–1 win over Saudi Arabia. Uzbekistan had to win to deny Saudi Arabia a place in the last eight and the Central Asians enjoyed the ideal start at Melbourne Rectangular Stadium as recalled 23-year-old Bunyodkor midfielder Rashidov netted inside the opening two minutes. Mohammad Al-Sahlawi did pull Saudi Arabia level from the penalty spot on the hour mark, but after substitute Vokhid Shodiev restored Uzbekistan's advantage 11 minutes later, Rashidov's second of the night with just over 10 minutes remaining saw Mirjalol Qosimov's side secure a fourth consecutive quarter-finals appearance.

Needing to win to progress from Group B alongside table-toppers China PR, Uzbekistan coach Qosimov made five changes following Wednesday's defeat by China, with captain Server Djeparov, Sanjar Tursunov, Igor Sergeev, Timur Kapadze and Akmal Shorakhmedov dropped to the bench. And it was one of their replacements who handed Uzbekistan the ideal start inside 90 seconds as Rashidov charged into the penalty area following poor defending by Saudi Arabia, coupled with a fortunate deflection, before coolly guiding his strike through the legs of goalkeeper Waleed Abdullah at his near post.

Uzbekistan remained on top as the half progressed against a shell-shocked Saudi Arabia who continued to struggle to settle into the contest with Cosmin Olăroiu's side, who showed one change from their win over North Korea last time out, only needing a draw to progress at the expense of their opponents. Saudi Arabia did enjoy a brighter end to the first half, although Uzbekistan goalkeeper Ignatiy Nesterov remained largely untested. The tight nature of the contest continued at the start of the second half, although despite Uzbekistan enjoying the greater share of possession, Saudi Arabia goalkeeper Abdullah was also enjoying a quiet evening following the early goal but the game suddenly swung Saudi Arabia's way on the hour mark as Al-Sahlawi confidently beat Nesterov from the penalty spot after Vitaliy Denisov had been adjudged to have bundled over Naif Hazazi inside the area as the pair challenged to meet Abdullah Al-Zori's left-wing cross.

Saudi Arabia, though, were back on level terms for just 11 minutes as Shodiev, who replaced Jamshid Iskanderov shortly after the equaliser, out-jumped Yasser Al-Shahrani to meet Shavkat Mullajanov's right wing cross, and the striker guided his header back across the face and goal and into the bottom corner with Abdullah rooted to the spot. And with Saudi Arabia pushing forward, Rashidov was found in space on the near side by Jasur Khasanov's superb cross field pass and the midfielder beat exposed goalkeeper Abdullah from inside the penalty area to double Uzbekistan's lead and hand 2007 finalists Saudi Arabia a second consecutive group stage exit.

China PR vs North Korea
Midfielder Sun Ke's brace saw quarter-final bound China complete their first-ever 100-percent record in the group stages of the AFC Asian Cup, after the Group B winners edged North Korea 2–1 at Canberra Stadium. With hosts Australia awaiting in the quarter-finals at Brisbane Stadium, China were set on the way within the first minute by Sun, before he added his second shortly before the interval.

A Gao Lin own-goal did see North Korea pull one back and So Hyon-uk hit the frame of the goal late on as the Chollima pressed hard for an equaliser, but China were eventually able to see out the third straight win of their campaign. Both sides had entered the final round of fixtures with their destiny's already confirmed with China guaranteed to top the table following wins over Saudi Arabia and Uzbekistan, while North Korea's campaign had been prematurely ended following defeats by the same opposition. China coach Alain Perrin stuck to his promise of going for a third successive win by selecting eight of the side who started in the 2–1 win over Uzbekistan, amongst them match-winning substitute Sun making his first start.

For North Korea, midfielder O Hyok-chol and defender Ro Hak-su lined-up for the first time with Ri Yong-jik suspended after his sending off against Saudi Arabia in the 4–1 defeat on 14 January. Canberra Stadium had seen the UAE's Ali Mabkhout score the AFC Asian Cup's fastest ever goal after 14 seconds in the previous fixture against Bahrain and Australia's capital was witness to an explosive start for a second consecutive match. Mei Fang's long ball up from the back was not dealt with by the North Korea backline and Sun nipped in to tuck the ball between the legs of North Korea goalkeeper Ri Myong-guk within the game's opening minute. Emboldened by the early lead China dominated for large periods of the first half, although North Korea did have a few efforts from distance with O Hyok-chol and Jon Kwang-ik having a go from range. And on 39 minutes, Jong Il-gwan had a glorious chance to equalise after his give-and-go with O Hyok-chol saw him put through on goal but the stretching striker could only lift his shot well over Wang Dalei's crossbar.

The miss was costly as just three minutes later China went two up with Sun again on the scoresheet. Jiang Zhipeng found himself in space on the flank and his curling cross from the left-side was met with a diving header from Sun at the back post that Ri couldn't keep out. The advantage could have been three just before half-time, too, as Yu Hai's chipped effort lofted over Ri but not Jon on the line who cleared. In the second half, though, North Korea came out determined to haul themselves back into the game and they reduced the deficit 11 minutes after the restart. Pak Kwang-ryong's cross reached Jong in the right-hand side of the area and although the striker's shot was blocked on the line by Zhang Linpeng, the defender's attempted clearance ricocheted off the back of the unsuspecting Gao and into the net. And Jong could have made the scores even just two minutes later as he met full-back Ro's cross with a leaping header from the penalty spot but his attempt soared narrowly over. North Korea continued their second half renaissance and on the 81st minute a scooped pass from Sim Hyon-jin was met on the volley from second-half substitute So and his pile driver from 25-yards out crashed off the crossbar with Wang beaten. Jo Tong-sop's side continued to press China in the final minutes but they were unable to make a breakthrough and exited the tournament pointless for the first time in their AFC Asian Cup history.

References

External links
 (Official website) 
AFC Asian Cup, the-AFC.com

Group B
2015 in Uzbekistani football
2015 in North Korean football
2015 in Chinese football
2014–15 in Saudi Arabian football